Mingachevir State University (MSU) is a public university located in Mingachevir, Azerbaijan.

History 
Azerbaijani President Ilham Aliyev has issued an order on establishment of Mingachevir State University. Mingachevir State University will be established on the basis of the Mingachevir Polytechnic Institute under the Education Ministry and ensure staff training on all levels of high education.

References 

2015 establishments in Azerbaijan
Universities in Azerbaijan
Educational institutions established in 2015